Aleoscar Blanco (born 18 July 1987) is a Venezuelan female volleyball player who participated with the Venezuela national team at the 2008 Summer Olympics in Beijing,  China.

Career
She played with Vargas in 2008. Blanco played for the Spanish club Ciudad Las Palmas G.C. Cantur for the 2008/09 season.

Clubs
  Vargas (2008–2011)
  Ciudad Las Palmas G.C. Cantur (2008–2009)
  Igtisadchi Baku (2010–2012)
  Olympiacos Piraeus (2012-2013)
  VTC Pezinok (2013-2014)
  Sporting Cristal (2014-2016)
  Universidad San Martín (2016-2017)
  Supreme Chonburi (2017–2018)
  Regatas Lima (2018-)
  Creamline Cool Smashers (2019)

Awards

Individual
 2017–18 Thailand League "Best Middle Blocker"

Club
 2017–18 Thailand League -  Champion, with Supreme Chonburi
 2018 Thai-Denmark Super League -  Champion, with Supreme Chonburi

See also
 Venezuela at the 2008 Summer Olympics

References

1987 births
Living people
Venezuelan women's volleyball players
Place of birth missing (living people)
Volleyball players at the 2008 Summer Olympics
Olympic volleyball players of Venezuela